Barn Hill Meadows is a Site of Special Scientific Interest (SSSI) in the East Riding of Yorkshire, England. It is located close to the town of Howden. The site, which was designated a SSSI in 1987, lies on the flood plain of the Old Derwent river. The site is important for its herb-rich, unimproved, neutral grassland. Several of the fields have been traditionally managed for hay and some retain remnant ridge and furrow features.
The dominant grasses are red fescue and sweet vernal-grass. There is also an abundance of great burnet, pepper saxifrage and meadow cranes bill.

See also
List of Sites of Special Scientific Interest in the East Riding of Yorkshire

References 

Conservation in the United Kingdom
Sites of Special Scientific Interest in the East Riding of Yorkshire
Protected areas of the East Riding of Yorkshire
Meadows in the East Riding of Yorkshire